John de Talaru (died 1393) was a medieval Cardinal and archbishop of Lyon.

Biography
Born near Lyon  he came from the influential Talaru family and was  the uncle of the Archbishop of Amédée de Talaru. 
His career began when he was made canon of the church of Saint-Justus in Lyon, then canon and custos of St. John's Cathedral. He managed to climb to the deanery of this institution, before being elected bishop on July 29, 1375.

In 1376, he held a local synod and 1378 he toured his diocese taking stock of the holding of all the places of worship, and  priests. This tour covers nearly 400 buildings. He is remembered in his diocese as bringing "a spirit of peace, a desire to bring the pastoral spirit and great libéralité"

He was made cardinal in 1389 by the anti-pope Clement VII at the request of the King of France, Charles VI, but he was never ordained as latter the same year, he gave up his seat to Philip Thurey. He died in 1393.

See also
Catholic Church in France

References

1393 deaths
Archbishops of Lyon
14th-century French Roman Catholic bishops
Year of birth unknown